Proscovia Nabbanja is a Ugandan geologist and corporate executive, who serves as the chief executive officer of the Uganda National Oil Company, since 1 October 2019. From 15 August 2019 until 1 October 2019, she served as the Acting CEO at the company. She replaced the founding CEO, Josephine Wapakabulo, who resigned, after three years on the job.

Previously, between November 2016 and August 2019, she served as the chief operating officer (Upstream) of the Uganda National Oil Company. Prior to that, she served as a Senior Geologist at the Petroleum Exploration and Production Department (PEPD), in the Uganda Ministry of Energy and Mineral Development, the first woman to hold that position.

Background and education
She was educated at Makerere University, Uganda's oldest and largest public university,  graduating with a Bachelor of Science in geology and chemistry. Later, she obtained a Master of Science in Petroleum Geoscience, from the Imperial College of Science, Technology and Medicine, in London, United Kingdom. She also holds a Master of Business Administration awarded by the Imperial College Business School, obtained in 2017. Her Certificate in International Petroleum, Oil and Gas Management was awarded by the Institute for Petroleum Management Inc., in Austin, Texas, United States.

Career
Nabbanja was hired by PEPD in 2000, right out of Makerere University, being the first female technical staff to be employed there. Over the years, she was promoted and as of May 2013, she was at the rank of Senior Geologist. In that capacity, she supervises a team of professionals who review the  technical proposals from the oil companies, on all oil wells-related issues. The data that her team collects is used to estimate how much oil and gas lies beneath the ground in the country. For a period of nineteen months, from April 2015 until October 2016, Nabbanja served as Acting Principal Geologist at PEPD, the position she left to join UNOC.

In October 2019, the UNOC Board of Directors, confirmed Proscovia Nabbanja as the substantive CEO at the company.

Personal life
Proscovia Nabbanja is a married mother of three children.

Other responsibilities 
Proscovia Nabanjja was appointed by Minister of Health in 2020 as member of board of directors of Malaria Free Uganda, a private public initiative by Government of Uganda under Ministry of Health charged with helping National Malaria Control Division (NMCD) in removing barriers towards implementation of National strategic plan through Advocacy, resource mobilization and accountability to all stakeholders.
 Cabinet of Uganda
 Economy of Uganda
 Josephine Wapakabulo

References

External links
Profile of Proscovia Nabbanja
Website of Uganda National Oil Company Limited
Website of the Uganda Ministry of Energy and Minerals

1978 births
Living people
Ugandan geologists
Ganda people
People from Central Region, Uganda
Makerere University alumni
Ugandan women geologists
Alumni of Imperial College London
21st-century Ugandan businesswomen
21st-century Ugandan businesspeople
Ugandan women business executives
Ugandan women chief executives
21st-century Ugandan women scientists
21st-century Ugandan scientists